Perry v. Cyphers 186 F.2d 608 (5th Cir. 1951) is the case that resulted in a court ruling that struck down Jim Crow legislation in Harrison County, Texas.

1951 in United States case law
Anti-discrimination law in the United States
United States Court of Appeals for the Fifth Circuit cases
1951 in Texas
Harrison County, Texas
Civil rights movement case law
United States Court of Appeals case articles without infoboxes